Cameron Wade is an Australian former professional rugby league footballer who played for St. George.

Biography
A utility player, Wade grew up in the small South West Queensland town of Charleville. Most of his first-grade appearances at St. George came as a winger, but he was also capable of playing five-eighth and elsewhere in the back-line. 

Wade debuted for St. George in 1990 and scored the winning try in the club's win over Canterbury in round 17, which in turn caused him to injury a hamstring. Not featuring again that year, he remained with St. George for two more first-grade seasons, amassing 19 games in total.

Wade returned to Toowoomba where he played, captained and coached the Newtown Lions in the Toowoomba Rugby League competition throughout the 1990's.

References

External links
Cameron Wade at Rugby League project

Year of birth missing (living people)
Living people
Australian rugby league players
St. George Dragons players
Rugby league wingers
Rugby league players from Queensland
People from South West Queensland